Charles Ian Burt (born 2 February 1937) is a former Australian rules footballer who played with Essendon in the Victorian Football League (VFL).

Burt started his career in 1956, with Ballarat Football League club Redan. He made four appearances for Essendon in the 1959 VFL season, on a permit.

A follower, Burt continued playing for Redan until being appointed captain-coach of Cressy in 1961. He steered Cressy to a premiership on his first attempt and did the same for Newlyn in 1962.

From 1963 to 1965, Burt played for Kyneton in the Bendigo Football League. He won the league's best and fairest award in 1964.

He returned to the Ballarat league in 1966 to captain-coach Daylesford.

References

1937 births
Australian rules footballers from Victoria (Australia)
Essendon Football Club players
Redan Football Club players
Kyneton Football Club players
Daylesford Football Club players
Living people